Denmark competed at the 1980 Summer Paralympics in Arnhem, Netherlands. 42 competitors from Denmark won 17 medals including 6 gold, 4 silver and 7 bronze and finished 21st in the medal table.

See also 
 Denmark at the Paralympics
 Denmark at the 1980 Summer Olympics

References 

Denmark at the Paralympics
1980 in Danish sport
Nations at the 1980 Summer Paralympics